Fausta of Cyzicus, also known as Saint Fausta (c. 298 – 311), was a 4th-century girl from Cyzicus. At the age of 13, she was arrested, tortured, and executed for being a Christian.

A pagan priest, Evilasius, was responsible for torturing and executing her. According to tradition, Evilasius converted to Christianity after watching her courageous resistance, and he was also martyred for this act. Although Fausta had remained impervious to the initial torture, she and Evilasius perished together in a cauldron of boiling water.

They are also venerated in the Eastern Catholic Church along with Maximus, the magistrate who condemned Evilasius. Tradition holds that Maximus repented at the last moment and joined the pair in the cauldron.

References

298 births
311 deaths
3rd-century Roman women
4th-century Roman women
4th-century Christian martyrs
Christian child saints
Saints from Roman Anatolia
Late Ancient Christian female saints